Karenni or Red Karen, known in Burmese as Kayah, is a Karen dialect continuum spoken by over half a million Kayah people (Red Karen) in Burma. 

The name Kayah has been described as "a new name invented by the Burmese to split them off from other Karen".

Eastern Kayah is reported to have been spoken by 260,000 in Burma and 100,000 in Thailand in 2000, and Western Kayah by 210,000 in Burma in 1987. They are rather divergent. Among the Western dialects are Yintale and kayahManu (Manumanaw in Burmese).

Distribution and varieties
Eastern Kayah is spoken in:
Shadaw township, Kayah State (east of the Thanlwin River)
Langkho district, Shan State

Eastern Kayah dialects are Upper Eastern Kayah and Lower Eastern Kayah, which are mutually intelligible. The speech variety of Huai Sua Thaw village (Lower Eastern) is prestigious for both dialect groups. The Eastern Kayah have difficulty understanding the Western Kayah.

Western Kayah is spoken in Kayah State and Kayin State, east of the Thanlwin River. It is also spoken in Pekon township in southern Shan State.
northern dialect: Shan State (north of Loikaw)
southern dialect: Hpruso and Dimawso townships (south of Loikaw)

Western Kayah dialects are part of a dialect continuum of Central Karen varieties stretching from Thailand. They include:
Northern dialect of Western Kayah
Southern dialect of Western Kayah
Dawtama
Dawnnyjekhu
Sounglog
Chi Kwe
Wan Cheh

Yintale, reportedly a variety of Western Kayah, is spoken in 3 villages of Hpasawng township, Bawlakhe district, Kayah State.

Yintale dialects are Bawlake and Wa Awng.

Kawyaw, reportedly similar to Western Kayah, is spoken in 23 villages along the border of Bawlake and Hpruso townships, in the West Kyebogyi area of Kayah State.

Kawyaw dialects are Tawkhu and Doloso, which have been reported to be difficult to mutually understand.

Writing system 
According to Aung 2013, Manumanaw Karen does not yet have a standardized script. Catholic missionaries developed a spelling using the Latin script which is used in religious documents, including the translation of the Bible. A Manumanaw Karen  literature committee has been set up and is developing literacy programs with SIL, using spelling based on Burmese script , so that it is accepted by Catholics and Baptists.

The tones are indicated using the caron, the acute accent or without the addition of these on the vowels: , . The diaeresis below is used to indicate the breathy voice on the vowels: .

Seven digraphs are used.

The five vowels of the alphabet are supplemented by four accented letters representing their own vowels.

Tones are represented using the acute accent and the caron over the vowel. The breathy voice is indicated with an umlaut below the vowel letter. Breathy voiced vowel letters can also have a diacritic indicating the tone.

References

Further reading
Kirkland, Cortney, and Erin Dawkins. 2007. A Sociolinguistic survey of Eastern Kayah Li in Thailand. Chiang Mai: Payap University.
Shintani Tadahiko. 2018. The Yintalay language. Linguistic survey of Tay cultural area (LSTCA) no. 115. Tokyo: Research Institute for Languages and Cultures of Asia and Africa (ILCAA).

External links 

 Eastern Kayah Li basic lexicon at the Global Lexicostatistical Database

Karenic languages